The women's points race at the 2018 Commonwealth Games, as part of the cycling programme, took place on 7 April 2018.

Schedule
The schedule was as follows:

All times are Australian Eastern Standard Time (UTC+10)

Results
100 laps (25 km) were raced with 10 sprints.

References

Women's points race
Cycling at the Commonwealth Games – Women's points race
Comm